Sterculia lanceifolia is a bush/tree species belonging to the genus Sterculia in the family Malvaceae.  This species is found in Bangladesh, NE India, China and Indo-China and there are no subspecies listed in the Catalogue of Life.

References

External links

Flora of China: Sterculia lanceifolia

lanceifolia
Flora of China
Flora of East Himalaya
Flora of Assam (region)
Flora of Bangladesh
Flora of Indo-China